Dinitrogen pentoxide (also known as nitrogen pentoxide or nitric anhydride) is the chemical compound with the formula . It is one of the binary nitrogen oxides, a family of compounds that only contain nitrogen and oxygen. It exists as colourless crystals that sublime slightly above room temperature, yielding a colorless gas.

Dinitrogen pentoxide is an unstable and potentially dangerous oxidizer that once was used as a reagent when dissolved in chloroform for nitrations but has largely been superseded by nitronium tetrafluoroborate.

 is a rare example of a compound that adopts two structures depending on the conditions. The solid is a salt, nitronium nitrate, consisting of separate nitronium cations  and nitrate anions ; but in the gas phase and under some other conditions it is a covalently-bound molecule.

History
 was first reported by Deville in 1840, who prepared it by treating silver nitrate with chlorine.

Structure and physical properties
Pure solid  is a salt, consisting of separated linear nitronium ions  and planar trigonal nitrate anions . Both nitrogen centers have oxidation state +5. It crystallizes in the space group D (C6/mmc) with Z = 2, with the  anions in the D3h sites and the  cations in D3d sites.

The vapor pressure P (in atm) as a function of temperature T (in kelvin), in the range , is well approximated by the formula

being about 48 torr at 0 °C, 424 torr at 25 °C, and 760 torr at 32 °C (9 °C below the melting point).

In the gas phase, or when dissolved in nonpolar solvents such as carbon tetrachloride, the compound exists as covalently-bonded molecules . In the gas phase, theoretical calculations for the minimum-energy configuration indicate that the  angle in each  wing is about 134° and the  angle is about 112°. In that configuration, the two  groups are rotated about 35° around the bonds to the central oxygen, away from the  plane. The molecule thus has a propeller shape, with one axis of 180° rotational symmetry (C2) 

When gaseous  is cooled rapidly ("quenched"), one can obtain the metastable molecular form, which exothermically converts to the ionic form above −70 °C.

Gaseous  absorbs ultraviolet light with dissociation into the free radicals nitrogen dioxide  and nitrogen trioxide  (uncharged nitrate). The absorption spectrum has a broad band with maximum at wavelength 160 nm.

Preparation
A recommended laboratory synthesis entails dehydrating nitric acid with phosphorus(V) oxide:

Another laboratory process is the reaction of lithium nitrate  and bromine pentafluoride , in the ratio exceeding 3:1. The reaction first forms nitryl fluoride  that reacts further with the lithium nitrate:
 
 

 
However, the product catalyzes the rapid decomposition of ozone:
 

Dinitrogen pentoxide is also formed when a mixture of oxygen and nitrogen is passed through an electric
discharge. Another route is the reactions of Phosphoryl chloride  or nitryl chloride  with silver nitrate

Reactions
Dinitrogen pentoxide reacts with water (hydrolyses) to produce nitric acid . Thus, dinitrogen pentoxide is the anhydride of nitric acid:

Solutions of dinitrogen pentoxide in nitric acid can be seen as nitric acid with more than 100% concentration. The phase diagram of the system − shows the well-known negative azeotrope at 60%  (that is, 70% ), a positive azeotrope at 85.7%  (100% ), and another negative one at 87.5%  ("102% ").

The reaction with hydrogen chloride  also gives nitric acid and nitryl chloride :
 

Decomposition is negligible if the solid is kept at 0 °C, in suitably inert containers.

Dinitrogen pentoxide reacts with ammonia  to give several products, including nitrous oxide , ammonium nitrate , nitramide  and ammonium dinitramide , depending on reaction conditions.

Decomposition of dinitrogen pentoxide at high temperatures

 
 
In the shock wave,  has decomposed stoichiometrically into nitrogen dioxide and oxygen. At temperatures of 600 K and higher, nitrogen dioxide is unstable with respect to nitrogen oxide  and oxygen. The thermal decomposition of 0.1 mM nitrogen dioxide at 1000 K is known to require about two seconds.

Decomposition of dinitrogen pentoxide in carbon tetrachloride at 30 °C

The volume of the oxygen formed in the reaction can be measured in a gas burette. After this step we can proceed with the decomposition, measuring the quantity of  that is produced over time because the only form to obtain  is with the  decomposition.

 

And this reaction follows the first order rate law that says:

Decomposition of nitrogen pentoxide in the presence of nitric oxide

 can also be decomposed in the presence of nitric oxide :

 

The rate of the initial reaction between dinitrogen pentoxide and nitric oxide of the elementary unimolecular decomposition.

Applications

Nitration of organic compounds
Dinitrogen pentoxide, for example as a solution in chloroform, has been used as a reagent to introduce the  functionality in organic compounds. This nitration reaction is represented as follows:

where Ar represents an arene moiety. The reactivity of the  can be further enhanced with strong acids that generate the "super-electrophile" .

In this use,  has been largely replaced by nitronium tetrafluoroborate .

Dinitrogen pentoxide is relevant to the preparation of explosives.

Atmospheric occurrence
Mixing ratios of several parts per billion by volume have been observed in polluted regions of the nighttime troposphere. Dinitrogen pentoxide has also been observed in the stratosphere at similar levels, the reservoir formation having been postulated in considering the puzzling observations of a sudden drop in stratospheric  levels above 50 °N, the so-called 'Noxon cliff'.

Variations in  reactivity in aerosols can result in significant losses in tropospheric ozone, hydroxyl radicals, and  concentrations.

Hazards
 is a strong oxidizer that forms explosive mixtures with organic compounds and ammonium salts. The decomposition of dinitrogen pentoxide produces the highly toxic nitrogen dioxide gas.

References

Cited sources

Nitrogen oxides
Acid anhydrides
Acidic oxides
Nitrates
Nitronium compounds